The Environment Modules system is a tool to help users manage their Unix or Linux shell environment, by allowing groups of related environment-variable settings to be made or removed dynamically.

Modules has been around since the early 1990s and is used at some of the largest computer centers to deploy multiple versions of different software tools to users.  The National Energy Research Scientific Computing Center (NERSC) reports that they use Environment Modules to manage nearly all software.  Environment Modules is specified as a Baseline Configuration requirement of the DoD High Performance Computing Modernization Program (HPCMP) Project Baseline Configuration team for participating DoD Supercomputing Resource Centers (DSRCs).

modulefiles 

The modules system is based on modulefiles, which specify groups of environment settings that need to be made together. Modulefiles can be installed in a central location for general use, or in a user directory for personal use.  Environment Modules modulefiles are written in the  Tcl (Tool Command Language) and are interpreted by the modulecmd program via the module user interface.

The key advantage of Environment Modules is that it is shell independent and supports all major shells such as  bash, ksh, zsh, sh, tcsh, and csh. The second key advantage is that it allows to use multiple versions of the program or package from the same account by just loading proper module. Those two advantages were instrumental in making Environment Modules a part of most HPC cluster setups. It also inspired several alternative implementation such as lmod from University of Texas, which is written in Lua instead of TCL.

modulefiles are created on per application per version basis. They can be dynamically loaded, unloaded, or switched. Along with the capability of using multiple versions of the same software it also can be used to implement site policies regarding the access and use of applications.

Default modulefiles directory 

The default modules search path is in a hidden configuration file you can display with:

The  directory used by some distributions (or any other directory) can be used after a build from source by modifying the  file.

Add your own modules to the path 

The  module essentially performs these steps:

Use a version file within a hierarchical organization 

The commands in this section require read/write/execute access to the /etc/modulefiles directory.  The $HOME/privatemodules or another directory can be used instead along with "module use --append" or modification of the configuration file specifying the default modules search path.

The default modulefiles directory is empty initially. Copy the null module to the default modulefiles directory to have it shown by "module avail".  The following uses the null and module-info modules to show use of a version file within a hierarchical organization and their effect on module avail and module show:
 mkdir /etc/modulefiles/test
 cp ${MODULESHOME}/modulefiles/null /etc/modulefiles/test/2.0
 cp ${MODULESHOME}/modulefiles/module-info /etc/modulefiles/test/1.0
 module avail
 module show test
Set the first version as the default:
 echo '#%Module' > /etc/modulefiles/test/.version
 echo 'set ModulesVersion "1.0"' >> /etc/modulefiles/test/.version
 module avail
 module show test
 module show test/2.0
Switch to the newer version as the default with:
 rm /etc/modulefiles/test/.version
 echo '#%Module' > /etc/modulefiles/test/.version
 echo 'set ModulesVersion "2.0"' >> /etc/modulefiles/test/.version
 module avail
 module show test
After the above following a fresh install from source you would see:
$ module avail

-------------------- /usr/local/Modules/3.2.10/modulefiles ---------------------
dot         module-git  module-info modules     null        use.own

------------------------------- /etc/modulefiles -------------------------------
null              test/1.0          test/2.0(default)

--------------------------- /home/user/privatemodules --------------------------
null

$ module show test
-------------------------------------------------------------------
/etc/modulefiles/test/2.0:

module-whatis    does absolutely nothing 
-------------------------------------------------------------------

$ module show test/1.0
-------------------------------------------------------------------
/etc/modulefiles/test/1.0:

module-whatis    returns all various module-info values 
+++ module-info +++++++++++++++++++++++++++++++
flags                   = 2
mode                    = display
name                    = test/1.0
specified               = test/1.0
shell                   = bash
shelltype               = sh
version                 = test/1.0
user                    = advanced
trace                   = 0
tracepat                = -.*
symbols                 = *undef*
+++ info ++++++++++++++++++++++++++++++++++++++
hostname                = localhost
level                   = 1
loaded null             = 0
library                 = /usr/local/lib/tcl8.6
nameofexecutable        =
sharedlibextension      = .so
tclversion              = 8.6
patchlevel              = 8.6.1
+++++++++++++++++++++++++++++++++++++++++++++++
-------------------------------------------------------------------

Automatic modules initialization 

Environment Modules on Scientific Linux, CentOS, and RHEL distributions in the environment-modules package include  and  scripts for the  directory that make modules initialization part of the default shell initialization.  One of the advantages of Environment Modules is a single modulefile that supports bash, ksh, zsh, sh as well as tcsh and csh shell users for environment setup and initialization.  This makes managing complex environments a bit less complicated.

For a source build the automation for all users can be manually configured.

bash, ksh, zsh, sh automatic modules initialization 

 from the  file in the 3.2.10 modules build directory.
 trap "" 1 2 3
 
 case "$0" in
     -bash|bash|*/bash) . /usr/local/Modules/default/init/bash ;; 
        -ksh|ksh|*/ksh) . /usr/local/Modules/default/init/ksh ;; 
        -zsh|zsh|*/zsh) . /usr/local/Modules/default/init/zsh ;;
                     *) . /usr/local/Modules/default/init/sh ;; # default
 esac
 
 trap 1 2 3
Copy the  file from the 3.2.10 modules build directory to the system initialization directory:
$ sudo cp etc/global/profile.modules /etc/profile.d/modules.sh
Add a version 3.2.10 symbolic link for the above generic addresses:
$ cd /usr/local/Modules
$ sudo ln -sT 3.2.10 default

tcsh, csh automatic modules initialization 

A  symbolic link to the  file in the 3.2.10 modules build directory can enable automatic modules initialization for these users.

Installing on Linux

Installing Environment Modules on Linux using yum and rpm 

On Scientific Linux, CentOS, and RHEL distributions Environment Modules is in the environment-modules package which can be installed with:
 sudo yum install environment-modules

Once installed the package information can be viewed with:
 rpm -qi environment-modules
 rpm -ql environment-modules

Installing Environment Modules on Linux using apt and dpkg 

On Ubuntu or systems using apt-get, Environment Modules can be installed with:
 sudo apt-get install environment-modules

Once installed the package information can be viewed with:
 dpkg -L environment-modules

Installing Environment Modules on Linux from source 

Although installing from a Linux distributions repository using that distributions update manager is the easiest the software can be installed from source.  Resolve dependencies is the most difficult task for an installation from source.  The typical configure, make, install cycle can become painfully slow as each configure improvement reveals another dependency not available in your default environment.  This section includes the steps to install the Environment Modules package on source including compiling the  Tcl (Tool Command Language) from source as a dependency.
 Installing Environment Modules

8.6.1 version of  Tcl (Tool Command Language) built from /usr/local/src 

Although the PCLinuxOS 64-bit repositories include  Tcl (Tool Command Language) they do not include a development package with the configuration files required to build Environment Modules on Linux from source.  Building Tcl from source will make the required files available.

Tcl Source: http://sourceforge.net/projects/tcl/files/Tcl/

Extract source after downloading

Configure, make, install

3.2.10 version of modules built from /usr/local/src 

Extract source after downloading

Configure, make, install

See also 
 Tcl
 Xsede Software Environments. The Extreme Science and Engineering Discovery Environment ― National Science Foundation
 NICS Modules Description ― The National Institute for Computational Sciences at Oak Ridge National Laboratory ― Department of Energy
 Lmod ― Lua-based module system
 Spack ― Package Manager for HPC Software developed at Lawrence Livermore National Laboratory

References

External links 
 http://modules.sourceforge.net/ - home page for the Environment Modules project
 John L. Furlani, Modules: Providing a Flexible User Environment Proceedings of the Fifth Large Installation Systems Administration Conference (LISA V), pp. 141–152, San Diego, CA, September 30 - October 3, 1991.
 http://lmod.sourceforge.net - alternative implementation using LUA instead of Tcl
 http://www.lysator.liu.se/cmod/ - alternative implementation using C only
 PennState Environment Modules User Guide
 Drag your design environment kicking and screaming into the '90s with Modules! - SNUB Boston 2001 - Erich Whitney, Axiowave Networks, Mark Sprague, ATI Research

Unix software